Nichinan may refer to:
Nichinan, Miyazaki, a city in Miyazaki Prefecture, Japan
Nichinan, Tottori, a town in Tottori Prefecture, Japan